Bukovje is a village northwest of Postojna in the Inner Carniola region of Slovenia.

Name
The name Bukovje and other names like it (e.g., Bukovica, Bukovec) are derived from the Slovene adjective bukov, from the common noun bukev 'beech'. They refer to the local vegetation. The settlement was known as Bukuje in German in the past.

History
During the Second World War, the Partisans had facilities for preparing and storing food in Bukovje. A Partisan lookout station was located on Čelo Hill near the settlement, and a relay station was located in the nearby Žnidar Shaft. In October 1943, German forces burned several houses and outbuildings in the settlement. On 20 October 1944, German and Chetnik forces attacked the Partisan Vladimir Gortan Brigade in Bukovje, with the loss of 25 Partisan soldiers and about 100 Axis soldiers.

Mass grave

Bukovje is the site of a mass grave from late in the Second World War. The Martinove Hrastnice Shaft Mass Grave is located on a hilly slope northwest of the settlement. It contains the remains of at least seven victims, probably German soldiers, killed in January or February 1945.

Notable people
Notable people that were born or lived in Bukovje include:
Jože Lipovec (1910–?), mountaineer

References

External links

Bukovje on Geopedia

Populated places in the Municipality of Postojna